Away From Here is the second studio album from the pop rock band Sirsy, and was released March 30, 2002.

Track listing
"She Says" - 3:55
"Paper Moon" - 4:56
"Uncomfortable" - 3:23
"Crybaby" - 3:50
"Kiss Me Here" - 3:59
"Please Let Me Be" - 3:19
"You" - 3:25
"Whenever You're Around" - 4:26
"Anyway" - 5:08
Kiss Me Here (Reprise)" - 2:06

2002 albums
Sirsy albums